Bhura Singh Valmiki  was an Indian freedom fighter and commander-in-chief of the army of princely state of Ballabhgarh. He led the army of Ballabhgarh state in the Indian Rebellion of 1857 and was hanged on 9 January 1858 in Delhi's Chandni Chowk along with two other leaders of the mutiny.

References 

1858 deaths
Indian  people of the Indian Rebellion of 1857
19th-century Indian people